McBain is a 1991 American action war film written and directed by James Glickenhaus, and starring Christopher Walken as the title character, alongside Michael Ironside and María Conchita Alonso.

Plot 
Santos (Chick Vennera) attempts to lead a people’s revolt in Colombia to overthrow the Presidente. When his revolt fails and he is killed, his sister Christina (María Conchita Alonso) goes to New York to find McBain (Christopher Walken), a lieutenant Santos rescued during the Vietnam War. McBain agrees to help, recruits his old war buddies, raises some cash by killing a few drug dealers, then leads an attack to topple the Colombian President (Victor Argo).

Cast 
 Christopher Walken as Bobby McBain
 Michael Ironside as Frank Bruce
 Steve James as Eastland
 María Conchita Alonso as Christina Santos
 Victor Argo as El Presidente
 Thomas G. Waites as Gill
 Chick Vennera as Roberto Santos
 Jay Patterson as Dalton
 Forrest Compton as President Flynn
 Luis Guzmán as Papo
 Dick Boccelli as John Gambotti

Production 
McBain was originally the name of an action movie character on the animated sitcom The Simpsons played by an analogue of Arnold Schwarzenegger. His appearance on The Simpsons predated the release of the film, and apart from the name, the film has no relation to the character.

Reception 
The film took in less than $500,000 at the box office in the United States.

Re-releases 
The movie was released on videocassette in the United States in 1992 by MCA/Universal Home Video and in Canada that same year by C/FP Video. Goodtimes released the budget tape of the movie some years later. Synapse Films stated an intention to release McBain on Blu Ray from a newly restored 2K transfer. Rifftrax released a video on demand version of the movie on January 25, 2013, including the running mocking commentary by stars of Mystery Science Theater 3000 including Mike Nelson, Kevin Murphy and Bill Corbett.

References

External links 
 
 
 

1991 films
1991 action films
Films directed by James Glickenhaus
Films shot in the Philippines
Films scored by Christopher Franke
1990s English-language films